Ishtar (born Esther (Eti) Zach on 10 November 1968) is a French-Israeli vocalist who performs in Arabic, Hebrew, Bulgarian, French, Spanish, Russian and English. She is best known for her work as the front vocalist of the French-based band Alabina, and her solo pop hits such as C'est la vie, Last Kiss, Horchat HaEkaliptus and Habibi (Sawah).

Early life
Eti Zach was born on 10 November 1968 in Kiryat Ata, near Haifa and was raised in Israel. She was born to an Egyptian-Jewish mother and a Moroccan-Jewish father, who had immigrated to Israel earlier.
She speaks Arabic, English, French and Hebrew.

She sings in Arabic, Hebrew, French, Spanish, Bulgarian, Russian, and English. In addition, she says she "half-speaks Moroccan Arabic".

Ishtar began performing in clubs at age 14 and continued even while enrolled in the IDF. Though she was born Eti Zach, she chose the name 'Ishtar', a Mesopotamian Goddess, because her grandmother called her Ester, which "with her Egyptian accent it sounded like Ishtar", she said.

It was around this time a friend asked her to join her in France. She soon fell in love with the country and decided to make it her home.

Career

Alabina years

At the age of 23, Ishtar moved to France and began to sing in clubs. She had her own group named Alef. She also performed as a backup vocalist for several famous artist and French singers such as Julien Clerc. In France, she was discovered by a producer who loved her voice. He introduced her to Los Niños de Sara. She joined the group as a lead vocalist and together they performed under the name Alabina.

Alabina soon became a worldwide success charting in the top 10 and top 40 several times in the US alone.

Alabina had found success mixing Flamenco, Arabic, Pop, and Dance sounds. Los Niños de Sara usually sang in Spanish while Ishtar would sing in Spanish, Arabic, French, Hebrew, or a mix of the languages – several songs were sung in Spanish and Arabic.

Solo career
Despite Alabina's success, after two albums Ishtar decided to do a solo project of her own (though still a member of the group); Los Niños de Sara also began to release CDs of their own.

In November 2000, La Voix d'Alabina (The Voice of Alabina) was released. It stepped up the Oriental pop sound while mixing in some traditional Arabic sounds and dance beats. Nine out of the twelve songs were mainly in French though Arabic, Spanish, English, and Hebrew were mixed in on various songs (for example Last Kiss was in English). Several of the tracks found dance floor success, including Last Kiss.

Ishtar also paid a visit to her fans in Israel, where she hosted a few television shows, singing duos with local stars such as Pablo Rosenberg, Avihu Medina, and David D'Or.

Ishtar continued to tour the world with Alabina for the next few years as she worked on her second album, Truly Emet, which was released in August 2003 this time with most of the songs being in Hebrew. However she decided to sing more songs in mixes of Arabic and Hebrew to show that there could be harmony between the two cultures. Truly Emet was again a dance floor success especially the songs C'est La Vie, and again Last Kiss.

A few more performances were done with Alabina, though as of 2005, the group had seemed to disband by no longer actively performing or releasing new music.

Ishtar's third album, Je Sais D'où Je Viens (I know where I come from) was released in November 2005. This time the music was still Oriental pop, however much less dance. More hip hop-type beats were stirred in with the Arabic music. Most of the songs were sung in Arabic, four were sung in French, and a few in English, while Spanish and Hebrew could be found throughout the album. Again she found dance success with such singles as Habibi (Sawah), which for the first time in her career featured a rapper JMI Sissoko.

Shortly after a greatest hits CD, The Alabina Years, was released, featuring a mix of Ishtar's solo hits, her Alabina hits, and some new English tracks as well.

Ishtar currently lives in France and is working on promoting her album "Best Of".

In 2005, Ishtar released her fifth album, which was recorded in Paris, New-York and Turkey, In this album, Ishtar adapted Arabic music from her childhood with various strains of Spanish and Western Pop music and featuring the artist Jimmy Sissoko.

After this album, she decided to take a break to give birth to her twins in 2007.

In 2009, she recorded the song 'Yahad' in duet with Kobi Peretz, which was awarded as 'Song of the Year' (Diamond Award) at the Big Apple Music Awards in New York.

In 2012, she released new album called "7". The album contains 12 songs including the first single "Mi Amor". In the same year, the Israeli film The Ballad of the Weeping Spring featured her in a dramatic role, and as a performer in the title song.
In 2016 she released a new album cooperating with the first French channel TF1 Who produced her album her first single A PARIS become a big hit right after the terrorist attack 
"I felt I want to bring joy to the city that adopted me and was good to me-Paris" she said.

Discography

Albums
(Only solo CDs are listed)
The Voice of Alabina (2000)
Truly (Emet) (2003)
Je Sais d'où Je Viens (2005)
The Alabina Years
Best of Ishtar Alabina
7 (2012)
Baila (2016)

Singles
"Last Kiss"
"Ragga Boom"
"C'est La Vie"'
"Habibi (Sawah)"
"Yahad"
"Mi Amor"
"Get Loud"
"A Paris"

DVDs
Alabina on Tour 1997–2000 (released 2002)

See also
Alabina
Los Niños de Sara

References

External links
Official web site 
Ishtar biography, from RFI Musique (in French)
English translation of RFI Musique biography
Think Flamenco-Arabian music. Think ALABINA!, from eStart News

1968 births
Living people
Arabic-language singers of Israel
Israeli dance musicians
English-language singers from Israel
Israeli pop singers
Israeli emigrants to France
Israeli people of Egyptian-Jewish descent
Israeli people of Moroccan-Jewish descent
People from Kiryat Ata
Israeli Mizrahi Jews
Spanish-language singers
Bulgarian-language singers
Folk-pop singers